Sigy-le-Châtel is a commune in the Saône-et-Loire département in the region of Bourgogne-Franche-Comté in eastern France.

Sights
 Château de Sigy-le-Châtel, ruins of a feudal castle.

See also
Communes of the Saône-et-Loire department

References

External links
Official website

Communes of Saône-et-Loire